Hatim may refer to:

 Hatim (Dawoodi Bohra) (died 1199), Yemeni Da'i al-Mutlaq of the Taiyabi Musta'lī Bohra Islam
 Hatim al-Tai, a pre-Islamic Arabian poet
 Hatim (horse), a Thoroughbred racehorse
Hatim (TV series), an Indian TV series about the poet Hatim al-Tai
Qaleh-ye Hatam, a village in Iran, also known as Hatimp
The Adventures of Hatim, an Indian TV Series aired on Life OK in 2013
Higher and Technical Institute of Mizoram, or HATIM, a college in Mizoram, India
Hateem, a semi circular wall near Kaaba